Gavriel Savit is an American actor, singer, and writer. His works include The Way Back and Anna and the Swallow Man.

Personal life 
Savit grew up in Ann Arbor, Michigan and attended the University of Michigan, where he received a bachelor of fine arts degree in musical theater. As an actor and singer, he performed on three continents.

Selected texts

The Way Back (2020) 

The Way Back was published November 17, 2020 by Knopf Books for Young Readers. The book received starred reviews from Kirkus and Booklist, as well as the following accolades:

 National Jewish Book Award winner (2021)
 National Book Award Finalist for Young People’s Literature (2020) 
 Kirkus Reviews' Best Books Of 2020

Anna and the Swallow Man (2016) 

Anna and the Swallow Man was published January 26, 2016 by Knopf. The book received a starred review from Booklist, as well as the following accolades:

 Odyssey Award for Excellence in Audiobook Production (2017)
 Sydney Taylor Book Award for Teen Readers (2017)
 American Library Association's (ALA) Top Ten Amazing Audiobooks for Young Adults (2017)
 ALA's Top Ten Amazing Audiobooks for Young Adults (2017)
 American Bookseller Association's Young Adult Book of the Year (2016)

External links 

 Official website

References 

People from Ann Arbor, Michigan
University of Michigan alumni
American male writers
American male singers
American male actors
Living people
American fiction writers
American young adult novelists
People from Michigan
Writers from Michigan
Writers from Ann Arbor, Michigan
Year of birth missing (living people)